Aýrybaba (since 2004 officially Beýik Saparmyrat Türkmenbaşy belentligi - Mount of the Great Saparmyrat Turkmenbashi) is a mountain in Central Asia. At  Aýrybaba is the highest mountain in Turkmenistan. It is located in the Köýtendag Range of the Pamir-Alay chain in the southeast of Turkmenistan on the Uzbekistan border.

See also
List of Ultras of Central Asia
List of elevation extremes by country

References

External links
 

Mountains of Turkmenistan
Mountains of Uzbekistan
International mountains of Asia
Turkmenistan–Uzbekistan border
Highest points of countries